Exequiel is a masculine given name. Notable people with the name include:

Exequiel Benavídez (born 1989), Argentine footballer
Exequiel Javier (born 1946), Filipino politician

See also
Ezequiel

Masculine given names